All Women Have Secrets is a 1939 American comedy film directed by Kurt Neumann and written by Agnes Christine Johnston. The film stars 
Virginia Dale, Joseph Allen, Jeanne Cagney, Peter Lind Hayes, Betty Moran and John Arledge. Also appearing briefly in one of her first screen roles is Veronica Lake, billed as Constance Keane.

The film was released on December 15, 1939, by Paramount Pictures.

Plot

Three young couples, all having financial struggles, decide to risk getting married. Joe Tucker and new wife Susie begin their new life living in a trailer. Slats Warwick is in a continuous quarrel with bride Jennifer, whose allowance from her parents is keeping them afloat.

The couple having the hardest time is John and Kay Gregory, a pre-med student whose studies barely give him time to juggle part-time jobs and a singer who finds work in a nightclub, but hasn't yet broken the news to her husband that she's expecting a baby.

Cast 
Virginia Dale as Jennifer Warwick
Joseph Allen as John Gregory 
Jeanne Cagney as Kay Parker Gregory 
Peter Lind Hayes as Slats Warwick 
Betty Moran as Susie Blair
John Arledge as Joe Tucker
Janet Waldo as Doris
Lawrence Grossmith as Professor Hewitt
Una O'Connor as Mary
Kitty Kelly as Flo
Joyce Mathews as Peggy
Audrey Maynard as Jill
Wanda McKay as Jessie
Margaret Roach as Betty
Veronica Lake as Jane 
Fay McKenzie as Martha
Barbara Denny as Alice
Gwen Kenyon as Helen
Marge Champion as Marion 
Lorraine Miller as Marie
Fay Cotton as Connie
Mildred Shay as Chloe
Lorraine Krueger as Molly
Phyllis Adair as Sybil 
Dick Elliott as Justice of the Peace
Billy Lee as Bobby
George Meeker as Doc
Lambert Rogers as Dick

References

External links 
 
 

1939 films
Paramount Pictures films
American comedy films
1939 comedy films
Films directed by Kurt Neumann
American black-and-white films
1930s English-language films
1930s American films